Brett Hinchliffe (born July 21, 1974) is an American former professional baseball pitcher. He was born with a genetic defect called syndactylism, a condition wherein two or more digits are fused together. As a result, the middle finger of his left hand was amputated as a child, and the bone was inserted into his thumb.

Seattle Mariners
Hinchliffe was drafted by the Seattle Mariners straight out of Bishop Gallagher High School in Detroit in the 16th round of the 1992 Major League Baseball draft, and spent most of his ten-year career in their farm system.

He made his Major League Baseball debut on April 5,  against the Chicago White Sox at the Kingdome, pitching three innings and allowing two earned runs. His first major league start came on April 18 against the Anaheim Angels. After Hinchliffe hit Angels third baseman Troy Glaus with a pitch in the first inning, Angels starter Steve Sparks retaliated on Ken Griffey Jr. in the third. When Glaus led off the fourth with a home run, Hinchliffe hit the following batter, Todd Greene, with a pitch, inciting a bench clearing brawl. Hinchliffe & Greene would be ejected from the game.

He made seven appearances, as both a starter and reliever, compiling a 0-2 record and 11.29 earned run average before being demoted to the Mariners' Pacific Coast League affiliate, the Tacoma Rainiers mid-May. Hinchliffe went 9-7 with a 5.15 ERA as a starting pitcher at Tacoma to earn a call back up to Seattle that September. He made four appearances upon his return, going 0-2 with a 5.11 ERA.

Anaheim Angels
He was released in January, and somewhat ironically became teammates with Glaus on the Anaheim Angels shortly afterwards. He appeared in back-to-back games against the Kansas City Royals on May 20 and May 21, but spent most of the  season in the Pacific Coast League. He went 2-3 with a 3.80 ERA mostly out of the bullpen with the Edmonton Trappers before being dealt with Keith Luuloa to the Chicago Cubs for Chris Hatcher, Mike Heathcott and Brett King. Assigned to the Cubs' Pacific Coast League franchise in Iowa, Hinchliffe went 2-0 with a 2.81 ERA.

New York Mets
He was released that winter, and signed with the New York Mets. He made one emergency start with the Mets in place of an injured Al Leiter. He surrendered a third inning grand slam to the Milwaukee Brewers' Tyler Houston. Houston's home run was followed by a solo shot by Angel Echevarria. Following a single by Henry Blanco, he was lifted in the third without recording an out.

References

External links
. or Baseball Almanac, or The Ultimate Mets Database

1974 births
Living people
American expatriate baseball players in Canada
Anaheim Angels players
Appleton Foxes players
Arizona League Mariners players
Baseball players from Detroit
Edmonton Trappers players
Iowa Cubs players
Lancaster JetHawks players
Major League Baseball pitchers
Memphis Chicks players
New York Mets players
Norfolk Tides players
Riverside Pilots players
Seattle Mariners players
Tacoma Rainiers players